Armistead Burt (November 13, 1802 – October 30, 1883) was a U.S. Representative from South Carolina.

Armistead Burt House - Abbeville, SC.jpgBorn at Clouds Creek, near Edgefield, Edgefield County, South Carolina, Burt moved with his parents to Pendleton, South Carolina. One of his brothers was future Civil War officer Erasmus Burt.
He completed preparatory studies.
He studied law.
He was admitted to the bar in 1823 and practiced in Pendleton.
He moved to Abbeville, South Carolina, in 1828 and continued the practice of law.
He also engaged in agricultural pursuits.
He served as member of the South Carolina House of Representatives from 1834 to 1835, and 1838-1841.

Burt was elected as a Democrat to the Twenty-eighth and to the four succeeding Congresses (March 4, 1843 – March 3, 1853).
He served as chairman of the Committee on Military Affairs (Thirty-first and Thirty-second Congresses).
He served as Speaker pro tempore of the House of Representatives during the absence of Speaker Winthrop in 1848.
He was not a candidate for renomination in 1852.
He resumed the practice of law in Abbeville.
He served as delegate to the Democratic National Convention in 1868.
He died in 1883.
He was interred in Episcopal Cemetery.

Sources

1802 births
1883 deaths
People from Edgefield, South Carolina
Democratic Party members of the South Carolina House of Representatives
People from Abbeville, South Carolina
Democratic Party members of the United States House of Representatives from South Carolina
19th-century American politicians
People from Pendleton, South Carolina